Ksenia Olegovna Makarova (born 20 December 1992) is a retired Russian, later an American, figure skater. She is the 2010 Skate Canada International silver medalist, 2009 Cup of Nice champion, and 2010 Russian national champion. She represented Russia at the 2010 Winter Olympics, where she placed 10th.

Personal life 
Makarova was born on 20 December 1992 in Saint Petersburg. She is the daughter of retired pair skaters Larisa Selezneva and Oleg Makarov, the 1984 Olympic bronze medalists. She has a brother, Alexei, who is nine years younger. Her family immigrated to the United States when she was 8 years old.

Makarova was an honors student at Newburgh Free Academy in Newburgh, New York. She became a naturalized U.S. citizen on 16 August 2013.

Career 
Makarova did not care for skating when she first stepped onto the ice at age 6 but a couple years later, after her family had moved to the U.S., she tried skating again and began to like it.

She began competing in the United States in the 2003–04 season at the intermediate level, where she placed 7th at her regional championship. The following season, again competing as an intermediate, she won the pewter medal at her regional championship and went on to place 15th at the U.S. Junior Championships. In the 2005–2006 season, competing for the final time as an Intermediate, she won her regional championship, but had to withdraw from the U.S. Junior Championships. She moved up to the novice level in the 2006–07 season. She won her regional championship and placed 2nd at her sectional event to qualify for the 2007 U.S. Championships, where she placed 7th. While competing for the United States, she represented the Hudson Valley Figure Skating Club, and she continued to represent that club in the United States while advancing in the U.S. Figure Skating testing structure.

Makarova switched to competing for Russia in 2007. At the 2008 Russian Junior Championships, she placed fourth in both segments of the competition to place 4th overall. In the 2008–09 season, she debuted on the ISU Junior Grand Prix. At her first event, the 2008–09 ISU Junior Grand Prix in Madrid, she won the short program and placed 8th in the free skate to place 4th overall. In her second event, in Sheffield, she placed 3rd in the short program and 4th in the free skate to place 4th overall. At the 2009 Russian Junior Championships, she placed 5th.

2009–2010 season 
In the 2009–10 season, Makarova began being coached by Galina Zmievskaya and Viktor Petrenko in Hackensack, New Jersey, and Nina Petrenko was her choreographer. Makarova competed on the 2009–10 ISU Junior Grand Prix series. At her first event, in Lake Placid, New York, she placed 4th in the short program and second in the free skate to win the silver medal. At her second event, in Belarus, she placed 2nd in the short program and 3rd in the free skating to win the bronze medal. This qualified her for the Junior Grand Prix Final. She then competed at the 2009 Coupe Internationale de Nice senior-level competition, which she won after winning both segments of the competition. She placed 4th at the Junior Grand Prix Final after placing third in the short program and fourth in the free skating.

Second in the short program and third in the free skate at the 2010 Russian Championships, Makarova finished first overall and qualified for the 2010 European Championships and 2010 Winter Olympics. At Europeans, she placed ninth in the short and long program to finish ninth overall. At the Olympics, Makarova placed twelfth in the short program, ninth in the free skate, and finished tenth overall behind teammate Alena Leonova. At Worlds, Makarova earned a personal best in the short program with 62.06 points. She was eighth in the free skate and finished eighth overall.

2010–present 
During the 2010–11 season, she won silver at 2010 Skate Canada International, her first medal on the senior Grand Prix series and placed seventh at the 2010 Rostelecom Cup. At the 2011 Russian Championships, Makarova placed first in the short program and sixth in the free skate, finishing fifth overall. In January 2011, she changed coaches to Evgeni Rukavicin in Saint Petersburg, Russia. Makarova placed fourth at the 2011 European Championships. She finished seventh at Worlds.

In the 2011–2012 season, Makarova competed at the 2011 Cup of China and the 2011 Skate America. She placed seventh at the 2011 Cup of China and fifth at the 2011 Skate America. She placed fourth at 2012 Russian Nationals. Makarova competed at the 2012 European Championships and finished sixth. At the 2012 Worlds, she placed ninth.

Makarova sustained a hip injury in 2013. Hampered by the hip injury, she retired in 2013; as of 2014, she was working as a coach.

Programs

Competitive highlights

Results for Russia

Results for the United States

References

External links 

 
 Ksenia Makarova at sport-folio.net
 Ksenia Makarova at fskate.ru 

1992 births
Russian female single skaters
Figure skaters at the 2010 Winter Olympics
Living people
Olympic figure skaters of Russia
Figure skaters from Saint Petersburg
Sportspeople from Newburgh, New York
Russian emigrants to the United States
Newburgh Free Academy alumni